Dame Mary V. Austin (née Hall-Thompson; 29 July 1900 — 10 September 1986) was an Australian community worker and political activist. The daughter of Admiral Percival Hall-Thompson and his wife, Helen (née Deacon), she was educated in New Zealand at Marsden College, Wellington.

Affiliations
 Red Cross Society (Superintendent Regional Commandant, Victorian Division) 
 Australian Liberal Party, Vice President, and later National Vice-President (1947–76)
 Victoria League, honorary life membership

Damehood
She was appointed DBE on 16 June 1979 for community and welfare services.

Family
She married Ronald Albert Austin (1893-1965) on 9 June 1925. The couple had one child, Derrick Albert Austin, who was born in 1926. Little other information exists regarding her personal life in Mortlake, Victoria.

Sources
 Draper, W J (ed.), Who's who in Australia, 1983, 14th edn, The Herald and Weekly Times, Melbourne, 1983 
 Draper, W J (ed.), Who's who in Australia, 1980, 23rd edn, The Herald and Weekly Times, Melbourne, 1980, vol 928, page 68

References

External links
  London Gazette notice of Mary Austin's damehood for "distinguished service to the community" 
 NLA profile
 Ancestry.com website info re Ronald Austin
 Ancestry.com website info re Mary Austin

1900 births
1986 deaths
People from Victoria (Australia)
Australian Dames Commander of the Order of the British Empire
Australian activists
Place of birth missing